Kinnersley is a village in Herefordshire, England.

Kinnersley may also refer to:

Kinnersley, Worcestershire, a location in Severn Stoke parish, Worcestershire, England
Kinnersley (surname)
Kinnersley Castle, Herefordshire, England
, wrecked in 1833
Kynnersley, Shropshire, England, sometimes historically spelled as Kinnersley
Kinnersley Manor, Horley, Surrey, England